Afrosciadium magalismontanum is a member of the carrot family, Apiaceae. It is a perennial tuberous herb native to subtropical regions in eastern South Africa and Eswatini. It has a tall, narrow stem which divides into multiple evenly-spaced branches near the top, with each branch sporting a cluster of small yellow flowers at its end.

Afrosciadium magalismontanum was previously known under the synonym Peucedanum magalismontanum before the genus Afrosciadium was established in 2008.

References

Apioideae
Flora of South Africa
Flora of Swaziland